Okanagan Boundary was a federal electoral district in British Columbia, Canada, that was  represented in the House of Commons of Canada from 1953 to 1979.

This riding was created in 1952 from parts of Kamloops and Yale ridings.

It was abolished in 1976 when it was redistributed into Fraser Valley East, Kootenay West, Okanagan North and Okanagan—Similkameen ridings.

Members of Parliament

Election results

See also 

 List of Canadian federal electoral districts
 Past Canadian electoral districts

External links
Riding history from the Library of Parliament

Former federal electoral districts of British Columbia